Kuhpayeh (also Romanized as Kūhpāyeh, Kūhpāye and Koohpayeh; also known as Kūhpā and Qohpayeh) is a city and capital of Kuhpayeh District, in Isfahan County, Isfahan Province, Iran. At the 2011 census, its population was 4,587, in 1,335 families.

The word "kuhpayeh" means "the foot of mountain" or " the base of mountain" and there are several cities and villages across Iran named "Kuhpayeh". The stoning of Soraya Manutchehri, a 35-year-old woman falsely accused of adultery on August 15, 1986,

Kuhpayeh has a distinct language/dialect, known as "Velayati" or " Kuhpaye'i" and very similar "Gazi language", which belongs to the north-western Iranian languages. (Indo-European -> Indo-Iranian -> Iranian  -> Western -> Northwestern II -> Tatic -> Kermanic/Central Plateau -> Southwestern -> Velayati/Gazi)

References

External links

 Iranicaonline.org

Populated places in Isfahan County

Cities in Isfahan Province